Pyrgus or Pyrgos was a fortified town of a district called Perippia, in Hollow Elis, in ancient Elis. It is mentioned by Polybius in conjunction with Lasion

Its site is unlocated.

References

Populated places in ancient Elis
Former populated places in Greece
Lost ancient cities and towns